The United States has held a total of 115 Yemeni citizens at Guantanamo Bay, forty-two of whom have since been transferred out of the facility. Only Afghanistan and Saudi Arabia had a greater number of their citizens held in the Guantanamo Bay detention camp. By January 2008, the Yemenis in Guantanamo represented the largest group of detainees.

Among the Yemeni detainees currently held (as of November 2015), 44 are recommended for transfer out of the facility, while twenty-three are being held indefinitely and are not recommended for transfer. Only Ali Hamza Ahmad Suliman al Bahlul has been convicted by military tribunal, and his conviction has been vacated on appeal. Two Yemeni detainees are awaiting trials by military commissions, Ramzi bin al-Shibh and Walid Bin Attash.



Events
A delegation of Yemeni officials visited Guantanamo shortly after it opened in January 2002.

On March 12, 2008, Mark Falkoff of the Center for Constitutional Rights issued a call for the repatriation of the Yemeni detainees, reporting that 95 Yemenis remained in detention, and they now constituted more than a third of the total detainee population.
Falkoff wrote that the delay in his release is due to a failure of the United States and Yemeni governments to reach an agreement on the security arrangements for the detainees, following their repatriation. By contrast, almost all the 133 Saudi detainees in Guantanamo had been sent home in 2006 and 2007.

Impact of Umar Farouk Abdulmutallab's alleged attempted suicide bombing
On December 25, 2009, Nigerian Umar Farouk Abdulmutallab allegedly tried to set off a suicide bomb on Northwest Airlines Flight 253.
By December 27, 2009, responding to rumors that Abdulmutallab had confessed to being trained and equipped in Yemen, various American politicians, including Joe Lieberman, Pete Hoekstra, Peter T. King and Bennie Thompson, called for American President Barack Obama to halt plans to repatriate the Yemenis.

Repatriation negotiations
An article published in the Yemen Post on November 13, 2012, reported on secret terms in the US-Yemeni repatriation negotiations.

Yemen recently had a change in administration.  Officials of the new administration said, "Saleh demanded $200 million in return for receiving the Yemeni detainees, but the US offered him only $20 million. The two sides could not reach an agreement to release the detainees by then."'

Repatriated detainees
Several returned Yemeni detainees were charged and stood trial, following their repatriation.
Yemen established a special Criminal Court for Terrorism where their trials took place.

On June 7, 2008, the Yemeni site Al Sahwa Net reported that negotiations were advanced for the repatriation of approximately seventy Yemeni detainees.

On June 7, 2008, Yemen Online'' reported that several Yemeni detainees had recently been allowed to their first phone calls to their families.
The article also reported that "informed sources" said Stephan Seche, the American ambassador had returned to the US to brief the Bush Presidency on Yemen's rehabilitation program for repatriated detainees.

List of Yemeni detainees in Guantanamo

See also
 Timeline of the release and transfer of Guantanamo Bay detainees
 Al-Asadi v. Bush

References

External links

 Fahed Abdullah Ahmad Ghazi's (a.k.a. Fahd Ghazy) Guantanamo detainee assessment via Wikileaks
 Yemenis cleared for release held in Guantanamo for years May 2011

Lists of Guantanamo Bay detainees by nationality
United States–Yemen relations
Yemeni people imprisoned abroad